Benhadad, Ben Hadad,  Ben-hadad (in the Jewish Publication Society of America Version) or Benadad (in the Douay–Rheims Bible) (Son of Hadad), may refer to:
Any king of Aram-Damascus. Hadad was the name of the senior Aramean deity.
Particular kings of Aram-Damascus:
Ben-Hadad I, king of Aram Damascus between 885 BCE and 865 BCE
Hadadezer (Ben-Hadad II), king of Aram Damascus at the time of the battle of Qarqar against the Assyrian king Shalmaneser III in 853 BCE. Also known as Adad-Idri (Assyr.) and possibly the same as Bar-Hadad II (Aram.); Ben-Hadad II (Heb.).
Ben-Hadad III, king of Aram Damascus and son and successor of Hazael. His succession is mentioned in II Kings 13:3, 24. He is thought to have ruled from 796 BCE to 792 BCE, although there are many conflicting opinions among Biblical archaeologists as to the length of his reign.

Hebrew-language surnames